is a Japanese video game company founded in 1994 by former employees of Toaplan following its bankruptcy. They are known primarily for their "bullet hell" shoot 'em ups; from 1995 up to 2013, CAVE was one of the most prolific shoot 'em up developers in the Japanese market. Alongside this, CAVE has produced a variety of other types games for arcades, home consoles, PCs, and smartphones, also dating back to 1995.

"CAVE" is an acronym for "Computer Art Visual Entertainment".

History

During a stockholder meeting in August 2011, the company changed the English company name to 'CAVE Interactive Co., Ltd'. However, the foreign www.caveinteractive.com domain name had already been established on May 15, 2011.

Key staff members include Tsuneki Ikeda (director and COO) and Makoto Asada (game development department head) who left the company in 2013.
On January 24, 2014, community manager "Masa-King" announced that the Cave-World Twitter and blog were shutting down on February 28, 2014, terminating all existing English social media presence in the west.

Within the Guinness World Records, CAVE holds the record for the "most prolific developer of danmaku shooters", having released 48 games in the genre since 1995 as of October 2010.

Subsidiaries
Mini4WD Networks Co., Ltd. (ミニ四駆ネットワークス株式会社) is a joint venture of CAVE Co., Ltd. and Tamiya established in 2006-02-01.
ORANGE AND PARTNERS Co., Ltd. (株式会社オレンジ・アンド・パートナーズ): A marketing division. On 2006-08-30, CAVE Co., Ltd. announced the establishment of the subsidiary, effective on 2006-09-05.
CAVE Asset Management Co., Ltd. (株式会社ケイブアセットマネジメント): Stock management and investment division. On 2006-08-30, CAVE Co., Ltd. announced the establishment of the subsidiary, effective on 2006-09-20-30.
Declease ltd., International Co., (日曜日の生): It/os management and development division. On 2014-18-09, Cave Co., Ltd. announced about subsidiarity of Declease ltd., International Co.,

Former subsidiaries
CAVE Online Entertainment Co., Ltd. (株式会社ケイブ・オンライン・エンターテイメント): On 2005-07-13, CAVE Co., Ltd. announced the establishment of the subsidiary specialized in online entertainment, with CAVE and Kenichi Takano owning 90% and 5% stakes, respectively. The company would be established on 2005-07-15. The subsidiary was established with CAVE, Kenichi Takano owning 92.3%, and 5.1% stakes respectively, with Kenichi Takano as the subsidiary's CEO and president. On 2006-07-24, CAVE Co., Ltd. announced merging the subsidiary and the online business into the parent company, effective on 2006-09-01.
Appci Corporation (アプシィ株式会社), a video game, music, and online content development company; formerly known as Tabot, Inc. (タボット株式会社) before June 1, 2018.
Beads Mania: Vendor of fashion accessories. On 2005-05-31, CAVE Co., Ltd. originally announced the establishment of beads accessory division beginning on 2005-06-01. On 2005-07-01, CAVE Co., Ltd. announced the complete acquisition of Craze Company (クレイズカンパニー株式会社) previously done in 2005-06-30 and became a 100 subsidiary of CAVE, which owned the Beads Mania (ビーズマニア) online shop. On 2005-07-06, Craze Company was renamed to Beads Mania (ビーズマニア株式会社). On 2008-05-07, CAVE announced the integration of Beads Mania business, effective on 2008-06-01. On 2010-5-19, CAVE announced the sales of Beads Mania shop and the associated mobile phone site to Tougenkyou Inc. tentatively on 2010-05-31, and the closure of CAVE's shops within Nihonbashi Mitsukoshi in 2011-7.

Marketing
 Since 2006, CAVE has hosted CAVE Matsuri, a yearly festival in which several announcements regarding company affairs are made. Also, some titles are offered exclusively at this event such as Mushihimesama Cave Matsuri ver 1.5. The most recent festival was held on April 16, 2018.
 A character of the same name represents the company within the company-collaborative RPG Hyperdimension Neptunia Mk2.

Games developed

Arcade games
CAVE's arcade titles have used various arcade boards over the years. Earlier titles used a CAVE-designed board based on a Motorola 68000 CPU, with later releases moving over to the PolyGame Master hardware, and then, starting with Mushihimesama, onto boards based on the Hitachi SH-3 CPU. CAVE dabbled in PC-based hardware for Deathsmiles II, but switched back to SH-3 for later titles.

Console games
On March 28, 2013 Cave released a special bundle called Cave Shooting Collection which contained all Xbox 360 titles published by them to that date (Akai Katana, Deathsmiles, Deathsmiles IIX, DoDonPachi Daifukkatsu Black Label, DoDonPachi Daifukkatsu Ver 1.5, Espgaluda II, Muchi Muchi Pork & Pink Sweets, Mushihimesama, Mushihimesama Futari Ver 1.5, and a download voucher for Guwange on XBLA), a disc containing all DLC for the aforementioned titles, 7 "superplay" DVDs, and a 10-disc soundtrack selection with songs from all of the included games except Guwange. This bundle was re-released as Cave Shooting Collection Complete on May 22, 2014 including DoDonPachi SaiDaiOuJou but not including the soundtrack collection.

Notes
 Not released outside Japan but release is region-free.
 Not released outside Japan but regular edition release is region-free.
 Not released outside Japan and Europe but release is region-free.

Mobile games

See also
Toaplan
Bullet hell

Notes

References

External links

Amusement companies of Japan
Video game companies of Japan
Video game development companies
Video game companies established in 1994
Japanese companies established in 1994
Software companies based in Tokyo